The German Beekeepers Association, "Deutscher Imkerbund", (DIB) is the umbrella organization of German beekeepers based in Wachtberg, Germany.  It was founded in 1907 for the purpose of promoting beekeeping and marketing of local honey under the trademark Genuine German honey.

References

External links
Official Website
Professional Beekeeping

Beekeeping organizations
Organisations based in North Rhine-Westphalia
Beekeeping in Germany
1907 establishments in Germany
Organizations established in 1907
Agricultural organisations based in Germany